Bow Brickhill railway station is a railway station that serves the civil parishes of Bow Brickhill and Walton in the City of Milton Keynes, Buckinghamshire, England. It is on the  —  Marston Vale Line, about 2 miles (3.25 km) east of Bletchley.

The station is served by London Northwestern Railway local services from Bletchley to Bedford. Services are operated using Class 230 multiple units. This station is one of the seven stations serving the Milton Keynes urban area.

History
The London and North Western Railway opened Bow Brickhill station in 1905, significantly later than many other stations on the branch.  It was one of seven halts built for the introduction of a steam rail motor service over the line. It closed temporarily during the first World War as an economy measure, from Jan 1917 to May 1919. Bow Brickhill lost its staffing and gated level crossing to modernisation in the 1980s, and since then the station has been unmanned except for two security cameras operated from other stations.

Until 2004 Bow Brickhill was unique on the line for having staggered platforms. The purpose of this is so that road traffic on the level crossing is not held up by trains standing still in the platform. However recently a number of other stations on the line including Aspley Guise have been rebuilt to have their platforms staggered also as part of the Bedford-Bletchley route modernisation.

Another oddity about Bow Brickill is that the road crossing here, the V10 Brickhill Street, has a roundabout immediately on either side of the crossing. This causes traffic jams whenever the crossing barriers are down, as each roundabout clogs with the traffic queue and remains so for up to ten minutes. Milton Keynes Council has a long-term plan for the level crossing to be replaced with a bridge, but the Transport and Works Act Order for East West Rail exempts Network Rail from any obligation to provide such a bridge as part of its works on revitalising this line.

Services
All services at Bow Brickhill are operated by London Northwestern Railway. There is no Sunday service. 

Since December 2022, the train service at Bow Brickhill has been suspended and rail replacement buses have been provided instead. This is due to Vivarail, who produced the  trains used on the route, entering administration.

Community Rail Partnership
Bow Brickhill station, in common with others on the Marston Vale Line, is covered by the Marston Vale Community Rail Partnership, which aims to increase use of the line by involving local people.

Location
The nearest post-code is MK17 9FH.

References

Notes

External links

Railway stations in Buckinghamshire
DfT Category F2 stations
Railway stations in Milton Keynes
Former London and North Western Railway stations
Railway stations in Great Britain opened in 1905
Railway stations in Great Britain closed in 1917
Railway stations in Great Britain opened in 1919
Railway stations served by West Midlands Trains
1905 establishments in England
East West Rail